, is a 1974 film, based on Kakou Senda's book of the same title.

Plot 
The film depicts the sad love story of a woman(Akiko) who became a Military Comfort woman.

Cast
Yutaka Nakajima
Mako Midori
Hideo Murota
Akira Kume
Nenji Kobayashi

References

Films about comfort women
Films based on books
1970s Japanese films